State Route 388 (SR 388) is a four-lane divided highway in Shelby County, Tennessee. The route connects the Frayser neighborhood of Memphis with Northaven and Shelby Forest. The entire route is known locally as North Watkins Street.

Route description
Although Watkins Street begins at Union Avenue in Memphis and passes through North Memphis and the Frayser neighborhood, the state route designation begins at the intersection of Watkins Street and Thomas Street (US 51/SR 3). Continuing north, SR 388 crosses over the Loosahatchie River; this is the last crossing before the river empties into the Mississippi River. After this crossing, SR 388 passes to the east of the Northaven community. Continuing northward, SR 388 abruptly ends at the two-lane Locke–Cuba Road. By turning onto this road, one can get to the Shelby Forest community and Meeman-Shelby Forest State Park.

History
The road was first extended from North Watkins and US 51 to around Robertson Road in the early 1970s. At the time, the official name of SR 388 was "Great River Road". When the route was extended to its current terminus in the late 1970s and early 1980s, the name "North Watkins Street" was given to the entire stretch. Even though this is the official name, SR 388 is part of the Great River Road and is a National Scenic Byway.

Future
Future plans call for Interstate 69 to cross SR  388 near Northaven.

Major intersections

See also

References

388
Transportation in Shelby County, Tennessee
Great River Road